Tarmo "Tare" Tapani Uusivirta (5 February 1957 – 13 December 1999) was a Finnish professional boxer who competed from 1982 to 1992, and challenged once for the European super-middleweight title in 1991. As an amateur he won a gold medal at the 1979 European Championships, and consecutive silver medals at the 1978 and 1982 World Championships; all in the middleweight division.

Amateur career
Besides the European title, Uusivirta won silver medals at the world championships in 1978 and 1982. He competed at the 1980 Olympics and lost in the second round to the eventual bronze medalist Jerzy Rybicki.

Professional career
In 1982 Uusivirta turned professional. In 1986, he had a draw with the then reigning European Champion Alex Blanchard in a non-title match. In 1987, he won against the future European champion James Cook (boxer). In 1988 he had a second draw with Blanchard, contending the IBF European super-middleweight title. In 1992, shortly before the European super-middleweight title fight against James Cook (boxer), Uusivirta suffered an injury and had to give up a close bout in the 7th round. He retired the same year with a record of 24 wins (16 knockouts), 4 losses, and 3 draws.

Retirement and death
After retiring Uusivirta grew bitter and regretted his move from amateur to professional boxing. He eventually lost his job as a fireman due to alcoholism, and committed suicide at the age of 42 in 1999.

Professional boxing record

References

Further reading
Rantalainen, Simo (2017). Tare: mestarinyrkkeilijän muotokuva (in Finnish). Johnny Kniga. .

External links
 
 
 

1957 births
1999 suicides
Sportspeople from Jyväskylä
Middleweight boxers
Boxers at the 1980 Summer Olympics
Olympic boxers of Finland
Suicides in Finland
Finnish male boxers
AIBA World Boxing Championships medalists
Super-middleweight boxers
20th-century Finnish people